Estadio Panamericano is a stadium located in San Cristóbal, Dominican Republic. It is currently used mostly for football matches.  It is the home stadium of San Cristóbal, a football club which plays in the Dominican Republic First Division. The stadium also hosts some Dominican Republic national football team matches.

References

Buildings and structures in San Cristóbal Province
Football venues in the Dominican Republic
Sports venues in the Dominican Republic
Venues of the 2003 Pan American Games